John Vickers (7 August 1908 – 24 September 1980) was an English footballer.

Career
Vickers played for Bishop Auckland, Hull City, Darlington, Doncaster Rovers and Charlton Athletic before joining Port Vale for £200 in May 1933. He played 32 Second Division games in 1933–34 and 26 league games in 1934–35, but lost his first team spot in September 1935, and made just 15 league appearances in 1935–36. He did though feature in the FA Cup giant-killing over First Division giants Sunderland at The Old Recreation Ground on 13 January. Vickers was released in April 1936, having played a total of 73 league games for the "Valiants". He then moved on to Newport County, South Shields, Hartlepools United and Stockton.

Career statistics
Source:

References

Sportspeople from Bishop Auckland
Footballers from County Durham
English footballers
Association football defenders
Bishop Auckland F.C. players
Hull City A.F.C. players
Darlington F.C. players
Doncaster Rovers F.C. players
Charlton Athletic F.C. players
Port Vale F.C. players
Newport County A.F.C. players
South Shields F.C. (1936) players
Hartlepool United F.C. players
Stockton F.C. players
English Football League players
1908 births
1980 deaths